Joel Dinis Castro Pereira (born 28 June 1996) is a professional footballer who plays as a goalkeeper for Eredivisie club RKC Waalwijk.

Pereira joined Manchester United's youth system in 2012. He made three first-team appearances for the club and spent time on loan at Rochdale, Belenenses, Vitória de Setúbal, Kortrijk, Hearts and Huddersfield Town. In July 2021, he joined Dutch club RKC Waalwijk after his contract at United expired.

Pereira initially played youth international football for his country of birth, Switzerland, before making more than 30 appearances for Portugal's youth national teams.

Early life
Pereira was born in Boudevilliers, in the Swiss Canton of Neuchâtel, to Portuguese parents from Cabeceiras de Basto. In his childhood, he played football for FC Le Locle and Neuchâtel Xamax.

Club career

Manchester United
Pereira signed for Manchester United at the age of 16 in 2012. He was part of the team that won the 2014–15 Under-21 Development League title, and extended his contract on 13 August 2015, amidst a goalkeeping saga at the club.

On 4 June 2021, Manchester United announced a list with eight players whose contracts are set to expire, with one of them being Joel Pereira.

2015–16: Loan to Rochdale
On 17 October 2015, he was loaned to Rochdale in Football League One for a month. Later that day, he had his first senior call-up, remaining an unused substitute as the team drew 0–0 away to Bury. On 10 November 2015, he made his debut in a 1–0 loss to Morecambe at Spotland, in the quarter-finals of the Football League Trophy. Manager Keith Hill praised the goalkeeper's performance after he was named man of the match and saved a penalty kick. On 19 November 2015, he extended his loan until 3 January 2016. Two days later, Pereira made his Football League debut, in a 2–0 away win against Doncaster Rovers. He totalled eight appearances for Rochdale, six in the league.

On 25 February 2016, he had his first call-up to a senior Manchester United game, sitting on the bench for their 5–1 home win over FC Midtjylland in the last 32 second leg of the UEFA Europa League.

2016–17: Loan to Belenenses and Premier League debut
On 31 August 2016, he joined Primeira Liga club Belenenses on loan. His loan spell ended on 5 January 2017, due to Manchester United's third-choice goalkeeper Sam Johnstone joining Aston Villa on loan. Pereira made his Manchester United debut on 29 January 2017, in an FA Cup fourth round tie against Wigan Athletic, coming on as an 80th-minute substitute for Sergio Romero. On 21 May 2017, he started for the first time in the Premier League, against Crystal Palace at Old Trafford.

2017–18: New contract
 
On 1 July 2017, Pereira signed a four-year deal to stay at Manchester United until 2021. On 20 September 2017, he appeared as a substitute against Burton Albion in the EFL Cup and conceded a last-minute goal.

2018–19: Loans to Setúbal and Kortrijk
On 2 August 2018, he joined Vitória de Setúbal on loan for the 2018–19 season. After making 10 appearances in all competitions, Pereira's loan spell was terminated in January 2019 and he returned to Manchester United. At the end of January 2019, he went out on loan again, this time to Belgium with Kortrijk. He made five appearances for the club in the Europa League playoffs.

2019–20: Loan to Hearts
Pereira went out on loan again for the 2019–20 season, joining Scottish Premiership club Hearts on 13 August 2019. He made his debut three days later in the second round of the Scottish League Cup, a 2–1 win at Motherwell. On 25 August, he played for the first time in the Scottish Premiership, losing 3–1 away to reigning champions Celtic.

In February 2020, with Hearts at the bottom of the Premiership table, Pereira was criticised for a series of mistakes, including in a 5–0 defeat to Celtic. Hearts manager Daniel Stendel admitted he was considering replacing Pereira for their next match against Hamilton Academical. Pereira made 25 appearances for Hearts.

2020–21: Loan to Huddersfield Town

On 29 August 2020, Pereira signed for EFL Championship club Huddersfield Town on loan for the 2020–21 season.

On 6 April 2021, Pereira was in goal as Norwich City thrashed Huddersfield 7–0. He was a last-minute replacement for Ryan Schofield, who was unwell.

RKC Waalwijk

On 5 July 2021, Pereira was confirmed as a new signing at the Mandemakers Stadion on a one year deal with RKC Waalwijk, who play in the Eredivisie, with the option to extend for another year.

International career
Pereira is eligible to represent Switzerland or Portugal at international level. In 2011, he made two appearances for the Switzerland under-15s (against Belgium and Turkey). He was promoted to the under-16s in September 2011, making his debut in a 6–2 win over Italy on 6 September, the first of five appearances in total for the under-16 team. Shortly after joining Manchester United in August 2012, he was invited to play for Portugal instead. He made 35 appearances for Portugal from under-17 to under-21 level.

In July 2016, Pereira was selected in the Portugal under-23 squad for the 2016 Olympic Games. He was an unused substitute in all four of Portugal's matches in the tournament. In May 2017, he was selected in the Portugal under-21 squad for the 2017 UEFA European Under-21 Championship.

Career statistics

Honours
Individual
Toulon Tournament Best Goalkeeper: 2016

References

External links
 

1996 births
Living people
People from Val-de-Ruz District
Swiss men's footballers
Portuguese footballers
Association football goalkeepers
Portuguese expatriate footballers
Portuguese expatriate sportspeople in England
Swiss people of Portuguese descent
English Football League players
Premier League players
Rochdale A.F.C. players
Manchester United F.C. players
C.F. Os Belenenses players
Vitória F.C. players
K.V. Kortrijk players
Heart of Midlothian F.C. players
Expatriate footballers in England
Expatriate footballers in Scotland
Switzerland youth international footballers
Swiss expatriate sportspeople in England
Portuguese expatriate sportspeople in Scotland
Swiss expatriate sportspeople in Scotland
Portugal youth international footballers
Footballers at the 2016 Summer Olympics
Olympic footballers of Portugal
Primeira Liga players
Scottish Professional Football League players
Sportspeople from the canton of Neuchâtel